is a train station located in Asahikawa, Hokkaidō, Japan. It is operated by the Hokkaido Railway Company. Only local trains stop. The station is assigned the station number F35.

Lines serviced
Furano Line

External links
Station information by JR Hokkaido Asahikawa Branch 

Railway stations in Hokkaido Prefecture
Railway stations in Japan opened in 1936
Buildings and structures in Asahikawa